Karle Pyaar Karle is a romantic Hindi film directed by Rajesh Pandey and produced by Suneel Darshan. The film features debutants Shiv Darshan and Hasleen Kaur in the lead roles. The film, as scheduled, released on 17 January 2014. It was inspired by a 2003 French film Love Me If You Dare. 
Karle Pyaar Karle released on 1000 screens across India.

Cast
 Shiv Darshan as Kabir
 Hasleen Kaur as Preet
 Aham Sharma as Jass
 Mahesh Thakur as Kabir's brother
 Aditya Kohli as Kabir's Friend
 Ankit Raaj as Goldie
 Sanjay Sharma as Bulbul Pandey 
 Aru Krishansh Verma as Bunty
 Yash Acharya as Little Kabir

Plot

Karle Pyaar Karle is a love story of two rebels, Preet and Kabir, who are playing the game of their life.  Since their childhood, Kabir and Preet indulged in playing dangerous games trying to fight the fear and complexes within. In a desperate moment, 8-year-old Kabir indulged in an act that led him to the juvenile home. In order to protect him, his mother decided to leave town so as to escape the harsh punishment. After travelling from one city to another for twelve years, the family returns to their home town where Kabir and Preet reconnect. This marks the beginning of a new chapter of dares and games.

Preet starts believing that they are ill-fated and it is best that they should stay away from each other. Kabir firmly believes that they can only survive if they are together. The movie ends in Orissa.

Critical reception
Rediff.com said that watching the film was a "waste of time", while the Times of India rated it 1.5/5.

Box office
On its opening day, the film collected 2-25 million, which overall on the first weekend after opening it raised approximately 70 million

Soundtrack

The official soundtrack was composed Sahil Rayyan, Rashid Khan, Prashant Singh, Mumzy Stranger and Meet Bros Anjjan. The lyrics were written by Rashid Khan, Shakeel Azmi, Kumaar, Suneel Darshan, Yusuf Khan, Mumzy Stranger, Paras Chaurasia and Mehmood Arfat. The soundtrack album released on 10 January 2014 .

References

External links
 

2014 films
Indian romantic comedy-drama films
2010s Hindi-language films
2014 romantic comedy-drama films
2014 comedy films
2014 drama films